Julie Beth Hagerty (born June 15, 1955) is an American actress. She starred as Elaine in the films Airplane! (1980) and Airplane II: The Sequel (1982). Her other film roles include A Midsummer Night's Sex Comedy (1982), Lost in America (1985), What About Bob? (1991), A Master Builder (2014), Instant Family (2018), and Marriage Story (2019).

Early life and education
Hagerty was born in Cincinnati, Ohio, the daughter of Harriet Yuellig (née Bishop), a model and singer, and Jerald William "Jerry" Hagerty, Jr., a musician. Her brother Michael Hagerty (1952–1991) was also an actor. Her parents later divorced. Hagerty attended Indian Hill High School. She was signed as a model for Ford Models at 15, and spent summers modeling in New York City. She moved there in 1972 and worked at her brother's theater group; she also studied with actor William Hickey.

Career
Hagerty made her off-Broadway debut in 1979, starring in Mutual Benefit Life at her brother's theater, The Production Company. In 1983 she appeared Off-Broadway at the Vandam Theatre in Shel Silverstein's 'Wild Life' directed by Art Wolff. It was an ensemble theatre piece co-starring Christopher Murney, W.H. Macy, Henderson Forsythe, Conard Fowkes, Jody Gelb, Howard Lee Sherman and Raynor Scheine. She continued appearing on stage, including starring in a Broadway version of The House of Blue Leaves. Her first film role was in All That Jazz, but her small part was cut out of the finished film. She was subsequently cast opposite Robert Hays in the parody film, Airplane!. It was released in June 1980 and became the third-highest grossing comedy in box office history at that time, behind Smokey and the Bandit (1977) and National Lampoon's Animal House (1978). Airplane! established Hagerty as a noted comedic actress.

Hagerty spent the 1980s starring in a number of theatrical films, ranging from the well-reviewed Albert Brooks film Lost In America and Woody Allen's A Midsummer Night's Sex Comedy to the badly received Beyond Therapy. Her roles often involved a naive or spaced-out character who seems to be unaware of whatever chaos was surrounding her, as exemplified in Airplane! and Airplane II: The Sequel. Throughout the 1990s and 2000s, Hagerty mostly appeared in made-for-television movies or supporting roles in Hollywood films, including the '90s comedies What About Bob? and Noises Off, as well as a part in the 2005 film Just Friends and 2006's She's the Man.

In 1991, she starred alongside Fran Drescher and Twiggy in Princesses, a sitcom that aired for five weeks on CBS. Hagerty had walked off set after four episodes amid poor ratings and negative reviews. She was cast in the 1994 Designing Women spin-off Women of the House, but was committed to another project when filming began, so Valerie Mahaffey substituted for her in several episodes. She eventually joined the cast, filmed two episodes, and resigned, handing the role back to Mahaffey, who bowed out after one final appearance. In 1998, Hagerty starred in the short-lived UPN sitcom Reunited. Then in 1999, she played Charlotte Sterling in Everybody Loves Raymond.

In 2000, she narrated the audiobook version of The Trolls, a children's novel by Polly Horvath. In 2002, she appeared in the Broadway revival of Mornings at Seven. In 2003, she began a recurring role as a babysitter named Polly on Malcolm in the Middle. She appeared as Hazel Bergeron in 2081, the film adaptation of Kurt Vonnegut's short story "Harrison Bergeron". Starting in 2011, she took over as the voice of Carol, Lois's sister, on Family Guy. In 2013, she starred in A Master Builder and appeared in a series of Old Navy commercials as a winking flight attendant. In 2015, she made another cameo appearance as a flight attendant in Larry Gaye: Renegade Male Flight Attendant. She had a recurring role as a pet parapsychologist on the series Trial & Error in 2017 and appeared in the film Instant Family in 2018. In 2019 she starred in the Showtime series Black Monday, the Disney film Noelle, and the Netflix film Marriage Story.

In 2021, she was cast in the Netflix action-comedy film The Out-Laws directed by Tyler Spindel and in the romantic comedy Somebody I Used to Know. In 2022, she was cast as Mrs. Parker, the mother of Ralphie in a sequel to the 1983 film A Christmas Story titled A Christmas Story Christmas, replacing Melinda Dillon, who originated the role in the original film but had retired from acting in 2007.

Personal life
Hagerty married Peter Burki in 1986. The couple divorced in 1991.

She married insurance executive Richard Kagan in 1999.

She is a supporter of the Democratic Party.

Filmography

Film

Television

References

External links
 
 
 

Living people
20th-century American actresses
21st-century American actresses
Actresses from Cincinnati
American film actresses
American stage actresses
American television actresses
American voice actresses
Female models from Ohio
Ohio Democrats
Television personalities from Cincinnati
1955 births